Založba kaset in plošč RTV Ljubljana or Založba kaset in plošč Radiotelevizije Ljubljana (acronym ZKP RTLJ, meaning Publishing and Record Label RTV Ljubljana in Slovene), was a major record label in the former SFR Yugoslavia, based Ljubljana, Socialist Republic of Slovenia. In 1990, at the start of the  breakup of Yugoslavia, the name of the company was changed to Založba kaset in plošč RTV Slovenija. It was and still remains a leading publishing firm in Slovenia.

History
Založba kaset in plošč RTV Ljubljana was the music production branch of the national broadcaster Radiotelevizija Ljubljana. In 1990, at the start of the  breakup of Yugoslavia, the name of the company was changed to Založba kaset in plošč RTV Slovenija.

The products of the company came out in the form of records in 1974, and CD/cassettes from 1986, and carried the company's logo.

Artists
The label is notable for signing numerous eminent former Yugoslav pop and rock. Some of the artist that have been signed to ZKP RTLJ include:

Atomsko Sklonište
Šaban Bajramović
Nikola Čuturilo
DAG
Den Za Den
Ekatarina Velika
Faraoni
Gordi
Jutro
Kerber
Kozmetika
Tereza Kesovija
Srđan Marjanović
Radomir Mihajlović Točak
Oko
Pankrti
Pop Mašina
Poslednja Igra Leptira
Laza & Ipe
September
Slomljena Stakla
Smak
Suncokret
S Vremena Na Vreme
Tako
Neda Ukraden
Videosex
YU Grupa
Zebra

Like other former Yugoslav major record labels, Založba kaset in plošč RTV Ljubljana was also an authorized publisher of foreign titles for the former Yugoslav market. It released albums by eminent international pop and rock stars such as: Blondie, Depeche Mode,  Electric Light Orchestra, Motörhead, Men Without Hats, Grateful Dead, The Jam, Jethro Tull, Madness, Prince, Spandau Ballet, Bruce Springsteen, Ike & Tina Turner, Ultravox, and others.

Competition
Other major labels in the former Socialist Federal Republic of Yugoslavia were: PGP-RTB and Jugodisk from Belgrade, Jugoton and Suzy from Zagreb, Diskoton from Sarajevo, Diskos from Aleksandrovac, and others.

Gallery

References

Slovenian music
Yugoslav record labels
Yugoslav rock music
State-owned record labels